Mohanbari or Chhota Jhanswa is a village in Matannail mandal, Jhajjar district of Haryana state, India.

References

Further reading

Villages in Jhajjar district